The Holy Cross Wilderness is a U.S. Wilderness Area located in San Isabel and White River national forests near Leadville, Minturn, Avon, Edwards, Eagle, and Vail, Colorado. The wilderness was named after its highest peak,  Mount of the Holy Cross.

Holy Cross Wilderness is a rugged and beautiful backcountry with many satisfying routes and experiences. The namesake of the wilderness Mount of the Holy Cross offers a challenging hike with a huge payoff. Its neighbor Notch Mountain grants the backpacker or day tripper with a clear view of the "Cross" that has drawn many a pilgrim to this site. Visiting this backcountry will check all the boxes for those looking for a wilderness retreat from the hustle of daily living.

The Holy Cross Wilderness has a history of many hikers, often those who are unprepared, becoming endangered. Primarily, the hikers who require rescue are unfamiliar with the risks of entering wilderness areas and do not bring adequate equipment and supplies to respond to emergency conditions. Holy Cross Wilderness visitors should carry adequate provisions, the ten essentials, including water, food, firestarter, guide book or map, global positioning device, layers of clothing, headlamp, knife, and cell telephone. Thorough research and reasonable planning should prevent most tragedies.

Holy Cross Wilderness hiking trails include Nolan Lake Trail, Lake Charles Trail to Lake Charles and Mystic Island Lake, New York Mountain Trail, Dead Dog Trail, Middle Lake Trail, Beaver Lake Trail to Beaver Lake and Turquoise Lake, Fancy Lake Trailhead (or Fancy Creek Trailhead on some maps) Grouse Lake Trail, West Grouse Creek Trail, Martin Creek Trail, Notch Mountain Trail, Half Moon Pass Trail to Mount of the Holy Cross, Tuhare Lakes Trail, and Cross Creek Trail to Treasure Vault Lake and Blodgett Lake.

References

 
Wilderness areas of Colorado
Protected areas established in 1980
Protected areas of Eagle County, Colorado
Protected areas of Lake County, Colorado
Protected areas of Pitkin County, Colorado
San Isabel National Forest
White River National Forest
1980 establishments in Colorado